The mobile phone network operator industry in Pakistan is a growing industry. According to figures from the Pakistan Telecommunication Authority (PTA), there were 152 million mobile 'phone subscribers' in Pakistan in March 2019.

Growth of mobile cellular phones services industry
PTA figures for 2007, for comparison, reported 48.5 million subscribers, rising to 102 million (over 60% of the population) by December 2010.

In 2007, the largest cellular mobile telephone service providing company in Pakistan was Mobilink, and other companies included Wateen (a member of Dhabi Group).

In 2010, there were five mobile cellular phone service operator companies in Pakistan.

See also 
 Paktel
 Zong Pakistan
Mobile phone manufacturing industry in Pakistan

References

External links
 
 
 

Mobile phone companies of Pakistan
Pakistan
Industries of Pakistan